Ascension is one of the largest private healthcare systems in the United States, ranking second in the United States by number of hospitals as of 2019. It was founded as a nonprofit Catholic healthcare network in 1999.

By the end of 2021, Ascension had 142,000 employees and 142 hospitals and 40 senior living facilities across the United States.

Company overview 

Ascension is one of the largest nonprofit and Catholic health systems in the United States as of 2021. It operates more than 2,600 health care sites in 19 states and Washington, D.C., including 142 hospitals and 40 senior living facilities. It employs more than 142,000 people as of 2021. Ascension had an operating revenue of $27.2 billion at the end of fiscal year 2021.  The company is led by president and CEO Joseph R. Impicciche and is headquartered in St. Louis, Missouri. at 4600 Edmundson Rd.

In addition to health and senior care facilities, Ascension also operates a for-profit venture capital subsidiary called Ascension Ventures, which invests in medical startups.

History 
In 1999, the Daughters of Charity National Health System and Sisters of St. Joseph Health System merged to create Ascension Health. In 2012, the company underwent a restructuring and rebranding, dropping the "Health" moniker and going forward as Ascension. In the process, the company brought its subsidiaries under a national umbrella and renamed all its hospitals to include the Ascension name, which the company hope would improve clients' understanding of the system.

In 2014, the company partnered in opening the $2 billion Health City Cayman Islands project, and sold its stake in 2017.

In April 2016, a class-action lawsuit was brought in federal court, alleging that Ascension subsidiary Wheaton Franciscan Services (in Glendale, Wisconsin), erred by treating its pension plan as though it was a "church plan," exempt from the Employee Retirement Income Security Act ("ERISA"), a federal law governing employee pensions. In January, 2018, the parties announced a settlement, in which Ascension would pay $29.5 million to the plaintiffs. 

Ascension announced plans to make changes to its business model in 2018, shifting away from a hospital-oriented business to one prioritizing outpatient care and telemedicine. The move was made in response to decreased government reimbursements, reduced profit margins, and higher costs of care.

In December 2018, the Attorney General of the District of Columbia brought suit against Ascension in an attempt to prevent the closure of the Providence Health System hospital, which served a low-income population but was financially unviable. Though the D.C. city council specifically passed an ordinance to give the city the power to block the closing, the suit was ultimately withdrawn by the Attorney General after reviewing plans for the hospital's closure.

In February, 2020, a jury awarded obstetrician/gynecologist Rebecca Denman, MD, $4.75 million in damages by an Indiana jury, after suing Ascension's St. Vincent Carmel Hospital and its St. Vincent Medical Group for defamation and fraud. The lawsuit arose from a December 2017 incident, in which Denman was accused of smelling like alcohol while on duty. Denman contended that she had been cheated out of the due process, as provided in the company substance-abuse policy, depriving her of a chance to establish her innocence, and retain her position.

Near the beginning of the coronavirus pandemic in March 2020, some Ascension hospitals in Wisconsin told uninsured patients they would not be charged for testing or treatment of COVID-19. Ascension drew some criticism for receiving some $211 million in relief payments despite having $15.5 billion in cash reserves, enough to operate for eight months. Ascension representatives responded by saying the payments were justified as the company had not laid-off or furloughed employees during the pandemic.

In 2021, Ascension opened a pharmacy hub in Austin, Texas. The hub fills 5,000 prescriptions per shift and houses a "patient engagement center" designed to offer patients assistance with understanding their medication. Officials with the company have said they hope to reduce hospitalizations by improving at-home prescription management through the hub. In October that year, Ascension and AdventHealth announced the planned dissolution of their joint venture AMITA Health in 2022. Each system will retain the hospitals they originally contributed to the partnership.

Project Nightingale
The Wall Street Journal reported on a collaboration between Ascension and Google in 2019 to share health information about its patients with the technology company. Known as Project Nightingale, the stated purpose of the collaboration was to make it easier for physicians to access and search their patient records. The partnership drew criticism over privacy concerns and the potential for violations of the Health Insurance Portability and Accountability Act, and the U.S. Department of Health and Human Services opened an investigation into the project in 2020. Cason Schmit, a professor of public health at Texas A&M University, noted that the Nightingale Project could improve health outcomes, especially by gathering data from minorities that are underrepresented in clinical studies, but also raised the lack of a patient opt-out and the Project's unclear transparency and accountability processes as concerns.

Hospitals 
In 2021, Ascension had 142 hospitals. Several of them have been recognized for care, including cardiovascular by Fortune magazine and maternity by Newsweek. Among them, Ascension St. Vincent and Ascension Sacred Heart Hospital Pensacola.

Community involvement 
Ascension launched the Medical Mission at Home program in 2007 in Tennessee as a method to expand care access to patients in need. It's an annual one-day program serviced by volunteers and others that has expanded to other states.  

In 2015, Ascension partnered with the St. Louis Chess Club and Scholastic Center to start the Your Move Chess Program in Ferguson, Missouri, to help the community following the shooting of Michael Brown. The organization has worked with grandmaster Alejandro Ramirez to teach children how to play chess.

In 2021, Ascension partnered with PGA Tour Champions to hold the Ascension Charity Classic golf tournament in St. Louis. In its first year, the event raised more than $800,000 for the Boys & Girls Clubs of Greater St. Louis, Marygrove, and the Urban League of Metropolitan St. Louis, among other groups.

See also 
 Project Nightingale
 Ascension Michigan

References 

Christian charities based in the United States
Hospital networks in the United States
Catholic health care
Catholic charities
Religious corporations
1999 establishments in the United States
Companies based in St. Louis
Health care companies established in 1999
Healthcare in the United States
Privately held companies of the United States
Charities based in Missouri
Non-profit corporations
Catholic hospital networks in the United States